Shane Muspratt (born 13 April 1979 in Ayr, Queensland, Australia) is a former professional rugby league footballer who played for the North Queensland Cowboys and the Parramatta Eels in the NRL.

Playing career
Muspratt has played for the North Queensland Cowboys and the Parramatta Eels in the National Rugby League. He then played for the Mackay Cutters in the Queensland Cup.

References

External links
Mackay Cutters profile
Muspratt @ rleague.com

1979 births
Australian rugby league players
North Queensland Cowboys players
Parramatta Eels players
Mackay Cutters players
Rugby league five-eighths
Rugby league locks
Rugby league second-rows
Living people
Sportsmen from Queensland
Rugby league players from Queensland